Cashnet is an interbank network in India managed by Euronet Services India Pvt. Ltd. which is a subsidiary of Euronet Worldwide. 

Banks can join the Cashnet shared ATM network whereby each member banks’ cardholders can perform transactions at other member banks’ ATMs.  Member banks will allow their customers to perform transactions at other member banks ATMs ("Issuing Bank") and allow other member banks’ cardholders to perform transactions at their ATMs ("Acquiring Bank"). All member banks are expected to be both Issuing Banks and Acquiring Banks.  

Euronet India provides the central switching and processing centre for the shared ATM network by establishing a host-to-host connection to each member bank, facilitating daily settlement between each participant and providing settlement reports. Switching and gateway services to international card organisations such as Visa, MasterCard, Amex and Diners Club will be provided.

History
The Reserve Bank of India (RBI) has granted the following approval on 8 April 2003. Cashnet was officially launched in Mumbai on 21 May 2003, and is the first Independent nationwide-shared ATM network in India.

Cashnet is India's largest private shared ATM network with IDBI Bank acting as the Settlement Bank.

Members
The network has 14 member banks with an approximate network strength of 10,700+ ATMs. The member banks of Cashnet are:

Axis Bank
Barclays Bank
Citibank
Corporation Bank
Dena Bank
Deutsche Bank
Development Credit Bank
Dhanalakshmi Bank
HDFC Bank
HSBC
IDBI Bank
ING Vysya Bank
Standard Chartered Bank
Kotak Mahindra Bank

Competitors
 CashTree
 MITR
 BANCS

References

External links
 Cashnet India

Interbank networks in India